Northgate railway station is located on the North Coast line in Queensland, Australia. It serves the Brisbane suburb of Northgate. Immediately north of the station, the Shorncliffe line branches off.

History
Northgate station opened in 1882 as Toombul with the opening of the North Coast line. It was later renamed Northgate Junction and then shortened to Northgate.

Services
Northgate is served by Caboolture, Redcliffe Peninsula, Sunshine Coast & Shorncliffe line services. Also see Inner City timetable

Services by Platform

Transport links
Brisbane Transport operates one route via Northgate station:
306: Nudgee Beach to Cultural Centre busway station

References

External links

Northgate station Queensland Rail
Northgate station Queensland's Railways on the Internet
[ Northgate station] TransLink travel information

Railway stations in Brisbane
Railway stations in Australia opened in 1882
North Coast railway line, Queensland